Mirjam Novero (1915–1996) was a Finnish film actress. She was the wife of the director Edvin Laine.

Selected filmography

References

Bibliography 
 Soila, Tytti. The Cinema of Scandinavia. Wallflower Press, 2005.

External links 
 

1915 births
1996 deaths
Actresses from Tampere
People from Häme Province (Grand Duchy of Finland)
Finnish stage actresses
Finnish film actresses